Afshin ibn Bakji Bey (fl.1016–1077) was a Turkmen general of the Seljuk Empire in the 11th century. He served three Sultans: Chaghri Beg, Alp Arslan and Malik-Shah I. He is believed to have disappeared after 1077.

Life
The young Afshin joined the service of Chaghri bin Mika'il bin Saljûk in 1016 and assisted him in his campaigns. Afshin seems to hae had a volatile temper which often resulted in excessive cruelty to his enemies and his own occasional disgrace.

In 1066, sultan Alp Arslan appointed Gümüsh-Tekin and Afshin to lead raids into Byzantine Anatolia. They set out from Ahlat and conquered many small fortresses between the Murat and Tigris river. When they returned to Ahlat, Afshin seems to have killed Gümüsh-Tekin for killing his brother. He therefore fled from Alp Arslan's anger and established some kind of relationship with the Mirdasid emirs of Aleppo and Ibn Khan as he sold his loot and captives on the markets of Aleppo. He returned in August 1067 to Anatolia, sacking Caeserea (modern Kayseri) and plundering Cilicia. He wintered in 1067 at the foot of the Black Mountain where he burned and plundered many monasteries and villages. He was besieging Attalia (modern Antalya) in April 1068 when he received news of having been pardoned by Alp Arslan after which he raised the siege in exchange for ransom and war supplies. It seems that the successes of his raids enabled his return to regain the favour of Alp Arslan as it had strengthened his position both practically and ideologically. Afshin then served as Alp Arlan's major commanders in the events leading up to the battle of Mantzikert in 1071 in which he participated. 

In 1077 or 1078, Malik Shah I shifted several commanders including Afshin Bey to be under the command of his brother Tutush to aid him in the conquest of Syria. Afshin earned a terrifying reputation because of the devastation his men wrought between Aleppo and Ma'arrat al Nu'man. However, after Tutush killed another Türkmen leader, Afshin fled again and disappeared.

In popular culture
He was paid homage by Diriliş: Ertuğrul, a historical docudrama.

See also
Artuk Bey
Battle of Malazgirt
List of fugitives from justice who disappeared

References

Sources

1016 births
11th-century Turkic people
Formerly missing people
Fugitives
Generals of the Seljuk Empire